The Highway, part of which was formerly known as the Ratcliffe Highway, is a road in the London Borough of Tower Hamlets, in the East End of London. The route dates back to Roman times. In the 19th century it had a reputation for vice and crime and was the location of the Ratcliff Highway murders. Prior to a renaming programme of 1937, different parts of the route had different names depending on what district they were in. 

The name "Ratcliffe" literally means "red cliff", referring to the red sandstone cliffs which descended from the plateau on which the road was situated down to the Wapping Marshes to the south.

Location
The Highway runs west–east from the eastern edge of London's financial district, the City of London, to Limehouse. It runs parallel to and south of Commercial Road, the Docklands Light Railway and Cable Street, and connects East Smithfield (the street) and the Limehouse Link tunnel.

Prior to the London County Council renaming programme of 1937, different parts of the route had different names depending on what district they were in. From west to east these ran: St. George's Street East, High Street (Shadwell), Cock Hill, and Broad Street. The whole of the central area of The Highway was named after St. George in the East church and the parish of St. George in the East.

History
The Ratcliffe (sometimes Ratcliff) Highway dates from at least Saxon Britain, running east from the City of London, London's historic core, along the top of a plateau near the edge of the eponymous "red cliff" which descended onto the low-lying tidal marshes of Wapping to the south.

In the late 19th century Charles Jamrach, a dealer in wild animals, opened Jamrach's Animal Emporium on The Highway. The store became the largest pet store in the world as seafarers moored at the Port of London sold any exotic animals they had brought with them to Jamrach, who in turn supplied zoos, menageries and private collectors. At the north entrance to the nearby Tobacco Dock stands a bronze sculpture of a boy standing in front of a tiger, commemorating an incident where a fully-grown Bengal tiger escaped from Jamrach's shop into the street and picked up and carried off a small boy, who had approached and tried to pet the animal having never seen such a big cat before. The boy escaped unhurt after Jamrach gave chase and prised open the animal's jaw with his bare hands. The tale was the inspiration for the 2011 novel Jamrach's Menagerie by British author Carol Birch.

A Roman bath house was excavated in 2004 by the junction of The Highway and Wapping Lane. The discovery of women's jewellery along with soldiers' possessions suggested that this location outside of the Roman walls allowed less restricted use of the baths than those in the City itself. The remains of the baths and under-floor heating system were re-buried under the car-park of a development of new apartments.

Song
There are two notable folk songs called Ratcliffe Highway ; one is a traditional folk song (Roud 598 ; Ballad Index Doe114 ; Wiltshire 785]. The other, Roud 493, also called The Deserter and famously recorded by Sandy Denny and Fairport Convention, concerns a young man who is pressed-ganged into the navy on the Highway.

Landmarks
Listed from west to east:
 St Katharine Docks
 Wellclose Square
 St. Paul's primary school
 Ensign Club – a local youth club
 Telford's Yard – a converted Victorian wool warehouse
 The Caxton pub – displays newspaper history on the walls
 Location of the Ratcliff Highway murders
 Mary Sambrook school
 The Travellers Rest – evangelical church
 The Old Rose pub
 Tobacco Dock – former warehouses for imported tobacco, converted to retail outlets
 St George in the East – a white stone church that has dominated the area since 1729
 St. George's recreation ground
 St. George's swimming pool
 Green Gables Montessori school
 St. Paul's Church, Shadwell – the church of sea captains
 Shadwell Basin – old dock now used for watersports and fishing.
 Glamis Adventure Playground – an example of the London style of adventure playgrounds created in the early 1970s
 King Edward Memorial Park
 Limehouse Link tunnel

Transport

Road
The Highway is a major arterial route into and out of the City of London and can become heavily congested during rush hour. There are two lanes in each direction throughout its length.  It lies outside of the London congestion charge zone (CCZ).

Bus
There are few bus stops on The Highway, but London Buses routes 100 and D3 pass along short lengths of it. Route 100 connects to Shadwell, Liverpool Street, St. Paul's and Elephant and Castle, while D3 connects to the Isle of Dogs, Limehouse, Shadwell and Bethnal Green.

Rail
The following stations are located on or near The Highway, all in Transport for London's fare zone 2:
Wapping (East London Line, now part of London Overground)
Tower Hill (Circle and District lines)
Shadwell DLR (also a London Overground Station
Limehouse DLR (also a National Rail station)

People
Some names associated with the area include:
 Arthur Morrison (1863–1945), author, wrote about Ratcliff Highway in his novel The Hole in the Wall (1902) 
 Sir William Henry Perkin (1838–1907), chemist who discovered mauveine, who was baptised at St. Paul's Church, Shadwell
 Oscar Wilde (1854–1900), visited the opium dens near Dellow Street
 Sir Arthur Conan Doyle (1859–1930), visited the opium dens as research for his detective character Sherlock Holmes
 Charles Jamrach (1815–1891), importer and dealer of wild and exotic animals who owned a shop on the street

 Captain James Cook (1728–1779), explorer and cartographer, who lived in the area from 1763 to 1765 and baptised some of his children at St. Paul's Church, Shadwell. A blue plaque commemorates him at No. 326, The Highway. (A slate plaque also marks another of his homes at No. 88, Mile End Road.)
 Jane Randolph (1720–1776), mother of Thomas Jefferson, was baptised at St. Paul's Church, Shadwell
 John Wesley (1703–1791), the famous cleric, who preached at St. Paul's Church, Shadwell
Nicholas Hawksmoor (1661–1736), the architect who designed the church of St. George in the East

The following people inspired some local street names:
Nathaniel Heckford and Sarah Maud Heckford – a young doctor and his wife who founded the first children's hospital in East London
Daniel Solander – a Swedish botanist who travelled with James Cook exploring the Pacific islands
Emanuel Swedenborg – a Swedish scientist, philosopher and mystic in the Georgian era

Neighbouring streets
West of The Highway:
East Smithfield

North of The Highway, from west to east:

Cable Street – runs parallel to The Highway
Dock Street
Ensign Street – formerly Wells Street (1862)
Hard's Place – a path between Wellclose Square and the south end of Ensign Street
Grace's Alley – formerly Gracie's Alley, a path between Wellclose Square and the north end of Ensign Street, and home to Wilton's Music Hall
Wellclose Square
Swedenborg Gardens
Betts Street – formerly connected Cable Street to The Highway
Crowder Street – formerly Denmark Street
Cannon Street Road
Dellow Street
Solander Gardens
King David Lane
Juniper Street – formerly Juniper Row
Tarbert Walk
Redcastle Close – formerly Carriage Way
Glamis Road
Glamis Place
Brodlove Lane – formerly Love Lane
Elf Row – formerly Elm Row
Glasshouse Fields – formerly Glasshouse Street
Schoolhouse Lane
Heckford Street – formerly Burlington Place, a trades wholesaler park
Ratcliffe Orchard – formerly The Orchard

East of The Highway:

Butcher Row – formerly White Horse Street
Narrow Street
Limehouse Link tunnel

South of The Highway, from west to east:
Vaughan Way
Telford's Yard
Artichoke Hill – the escape route for the Ratcliff Highway murderers
Chigwell Hill
Pennington Street
Wapping Lane – formerly Old Gravel Lane
Sovereign Close
Princes Court
West Gardens
Rum Close
Garnet Street – formerly New Gravel Lane
Newlands Quay – formerly Elbow Lane
Maynards Quay
Glamis Road
Pear Tree Lane – formerly Fox's Lane, now named after The Pear Tree, the inn where the second Ratcliff Highway murders took place
Shadwell Basin
Jardine Road
Rialto Avenue

References
Citations

Sources

Streets in the London Borough of Tower Hamlets
Wapping
Shadwell
Limehouse